Konstantīns Raudive (1909 in Asūne, Vitebsk Governorate – 1974), known internationally as Konstantin Raudive, was a Latvian writer and intellectual, and husband of Zenta Mauriņa. Raudive was born in Latgale in eastern Latvia (then part of Vitebsk Governorate) but studied extensively abroad, later becoming a student of Carl Jung. In exile following the Soviet re-occupation of Latvia in 1944, he taught at the University of Uppsala in Sweden.

Raudive studied parapsychology all his life, and was especially interested in the possibility of the afterlife. He and German parapsychologist Hans Bender investigated electronic voice phenomena (EVP). He published a book on EVP, Breakthrough, in 1971. Raudive was a scientist as well as a practising Roman Catholic.

EVP research

In 1964, Raudive read Friedrich Jürgenson's book, Voices from Space, and was so impressed by it that he arranged to meet Jürgenson in 1965. He then worked with Jürgenson to make some EVP recordings, but their first efforts bore little fruit, although they believed that they could hear very weak, muddled voices. According to Raudive, however, one night, as he listened to one recording, he clearly heard a number of voices. When he played the tape over and over, he came to believe he understood all of them. He thought some of which were in German, some in Latvian, some in French. The last voice on the tape, according to Raudive, a woman's voice, said "Ve a dormir, Margarete" ("Go to sleep, Margaret").

Raudive later wrote (in his book Breakthrough):

These words made a deep impression on me, as Margarete Petrautzki had died recently, and her illness and death had greatly affected me.

Raudive started researching such alleged voices on his own and spent much of the last ten years of his life exploring EVP. With the help of various electronics experts, he recorded over 100,000 audiotapes, most of which were made under what he described as "strict laboratory conditions." He collaborated at times with Bender. Over 400 people were involved in his research, and all apparently heard the voices. This culminated in the 1968 publication of Unhörbares wird hörbar (“What is inaudible becomes audible”). The book was published in English in 1971 as Breakthrough.

Methods

Raudive developed several different approaches to recording EVP:

 Microphone voices: one simply leaves the tape recorder running, with no one talking; he indicated that one can even disconnect the microphone.
 Radio voices: one records the white noise from a radio that is not tuned to any station.
 Diode voices: one records from what is essentially a crystal set, not tuned to a station.

EVP characteristics

Raudive delineated a number of characteristics of the voices, (as laid out in Breakthrough):

 "The voice entities speak very rapidly, in a mixture of languages, sometimes as many as five or six in one sentence."
 "They speak in a definite rhythm, which seems forced on them."
 "The rhythmic mode imposes a shortened, telegram-style phrase or sentence."
 Probably because of this, "… grammatical rules are frequently abandoned and neologisms abound."

Cultural references
A sample of the tape was used by The Smiths in their song Rubber Ring.
William Peter Blatty references "Breakthrough: An amazing experiment in electronic communication with the dead" in "Legion", his sequel to "The Exorcist".

Notes

Sources

External links
 Specters of the Spectrum, by Jared Keane Feldman, New York Moon
  of Konstantin Raudive. Apparently a chapter of a book, Paraphysics and EVP: a mind over matter investigation 1984–2001, author unspecified.

Calling Earth (completed 2017), a 95-minute documentary about the Electronic Voice Phenomenon and Instrumental Transcommunication, featuring Dr. Raudive and numerous other pioneers in the field of afterlife communication via modern electronics. Produced by Daniel Drasin. vimeo.com/101171248

1909 births
1974 deaths
People from Dagda Municipality
People from Dvinsky Uyezd
Latvian Roman Catholics
Latvian writers
Parapsychologists
Latvian emigrants to Sweden
Latvian World War II refugees